Privilege Style is a Spanish charter airline headquartered in Palma de Mallorca and based at Adolfo Suárez Madrid–Barajas Airport.

Operations 
According to the airline, its VIP customers include several Spanish companies and also teams from Spain's first football league. In June and July 2014, Privilege Style operated Finnair's flights from Helsinki to New York-JFK while one of Finnair's A330s was out of service for extended maintenance. The same happened again in December 2015. In the summer of 2015, the airline leased its Boeing 767-300ER to El Al. As of June 2016, all of Privilege Style's aircraft were operating for El Al, except the 767 which currently operates for Condor Flugdienst.

In 2018 the 777 operated daily for Norwegian on the Rome Fiumicino-Newark EWR route, due to major technical issues affecting Norwegian’s 787 fleet.  In late spring 2019, Norwegian have again started using Privilege Style's 777 for their London to Miami route. In November 2019, Surinam Airways started using Privilege Style's 777 for their Paramaribo to Amsterdam route, after they had to suddenly retire their only long-haul plane, an aging Airbus A340.

In February 2021, Privilege Style has selected the Airbus A321 as a replacement for their aging 757s. The used A321 was formerly operated by Sri Lankan Airlines.

Controversies 
The company's involvement in deportation flights from various EU countries has drawn criticism from human rights activists. Privilege Style has allegedly been involved in the deportation of Jamaican migrants shackled in  leg irons from the UK on 2 December 2020, as well as in the deportation of Afghan migrants from Germany on 9 February 2021 and 4 April 2021. The company was scheduled to undertake a deportation flight of asylum seekers from the UK to Rwanda on 14 June 2022 although this never went ahead due to legal challenges.　After pressure from various campaign groups, in October 2022 the company announced that it would renounce carrying deportation flights from the UK to Rwanda.

Fleet 

As of November 2022, Privilege Style's fleet consists of the following aircraft:

References

External links

Official website

Airlines of Spain
Airlines established in 2003